Nurulular is a village in the municipality of Qaramanlı in the Yevlakh Rayon of Azerbaijan.

References

Populated places in Yevlakh District